Kanagarthi is a village in Jammikunta mandal, Karimnagar district, Telangana, India. The population was 2,539 at the 2011 Indian census.

References

Villages in Karimnagar district